is a very common feminine Japanese given name.  Not to be confused with Kiyoko.

Possible writings
The final syllable "ko" is typically written with the kanji character for child, 子. It is a common suffix to female names in Japan.
The first syllable "Kyō" can be written several different ways, with different meanings.
恭, "respectful,"
京, "of the city or of the capital,"
今日, "of today,"
杏, "apricot,"
鏡, "mirror,"
響, "echo", "influential"

The name can also be written in hiragana or katakana.

People with the name
Kyoko Aizome (恭子), an AV actress, singer, director, and writer
Kyoko Ariyoshi (京子), a Japanese shōjo manga artist
Kyoko Chan Cox, the daughter of Yoko Ono and jazz musician Anthony Cox
Kyoko Fukada (恭子), a Japanese actress, model, and singer
Kyoko Hamaguchi (京子), a Japanese freestyle wrestler
Kyōko Hasegawa (京子), a Japanese actress
Kyoko Hayashi (京子), a Japanese author
Kyoko Hikami (恭子), a Japanese voice actress
Kyoko Ina (恭子), a Japanese figure skater
Kyoko Inoue (京子), a Japanese professional wrestler
, Japanese volleyball player
Kyoko Iwasaki (恭子), a Japanese swimmer, Olympic gold medalist
Kyoko Izawa (京子), a Japanese politician
, Japanese professional wrestler and mixed martial artist
Kyōko Kishida (今日子), a Japanese actress, voice actress, and children's book writer
Kyōko Kagawa (京子), a Japanese actress
Kyoko Kano, an older sister of the Japanese celebrities Kano Sisters
Kyoko Kitamura, a Japanese American musician
Kyōko Koizumi (今日子), a Japanese singer and actress
, Japanese gymnast
, Japanese gymnast
Kyoko Miyagi aka Kyouko Tonguu (恭子), a Japanese voice actress
Kyoko Mizuki (杏子), a Japanese writer
, Japanese writer
Kyoko Nakayama (恭子), a Japanese politician
Kyoko Nishikawa (京子), a Japanese politician
, Japanese idol
, Japanese badminton player
, Japanese speed skater
Kyoko Takezawa (恭子), a Japanese violinist
Kyoko Terase (今日子), a Japanese voice actress
, Japanese table tennis player
Kyoko Yamada, a Japanese voice actress
, Japanese archer

Fictional characters
 Kyoko Hori (堀 京子), the main female protagonist of the manga and anime Hori-san to Miyamura-kun (Horimiya)
Kyoko Harase (京子), a character in the 2003 J-Horror film Ju-on: The Grudge 2
Kyoko Himeji, a character from Girl's High (Joshikousei)
Kyoko Kirisaki, a fictional pyrokinetic
Kyoko Honda (今日子), a character in the manga and anime series Fruits Basket
Kyoko Minazuki (響子), a playable character in the fighting game series Rival Schools
Kyoko Iwase(恭子), a racing character from Initial D series.
Kyoko Mogami (キョーコ), the main heroine of the shōjo manga Skip Beat!
Kyoko Okitegami (今日子), the main character in Okitegami Kyoko no Biboroku
Kyoko Otonashi (響子), the female protagonist of the manga and anime series Maison Ikkoku
Kyoko Zeppelin Soryu (キョウコ), a character in the anime series Neon Genesis Evangelion
Kyoko Sasagawa (京子), a character in the anime series Katekyo Hitman REBORN!
Kyoko, a friendly home computer in the 2008 Janet Jackson album Discipline
Kyoko Hoin, a character in Kodomo no Jikan
Kyoko Okudera, the main female protagonist in the Japanese horror movie Chakushin Ari 2
Kyoko, a To-Oh University student in the anime and manga series Death Note (appears volumes 3 and 4, episodes 9, 10, and 15). She is noted for her crush on the Detective L. 

Kyoko, a young woman who comes to New York City to find a man who taught her to dance salsa, from the novel Kyoko by Ryū Murakami.
Kyoko, a character in Kore wa Zombie Desu ka?
Kyoko, a character in Yukio Mishima's Kyoko no Ie (Kyōko no Ie 鏡子の家)
Kyoko, a character in Log Horizon
Kyoko Sakura (佐倉 杏子), a character in Puella Magi Madoka Magica
Kyoko Toshinō, a character in Yuru Yuri
Kyōko Shirafuji (白藤 杏子), a female character in the manga and anime series Working!!.

Kyoko Ozaki- the wife of Doctor Toshio Ozaki in the anime, manga, and novel, Shiki
Kyōko Kasodani, a character in Ten Desires
Kyōko, a character in Shin Nekketsu Kōha: Kunio-tachi no Banka and later River City Girls
Kyoko, servant to Blue Book CEO Nathan Bateman in Ex Machina

Fiction works
Kyoko, a novel by Ryū Murakami
Kyoko or, in English, Because of You, a film inspired by Ryū Murakami's book

References

Japanese feminine given names